Ulugbek Yuldashev is a entrepreneur best known as founder of  Awok.com, one of the largest e-commerce retailers in the Arab World. He founded the online store in 2013, which commenced operations, by selling electronics and gadgets and closed down by May 2020 due to lack of funds.

Early life
Ulugbek Yuldashev was born in Osh, Kyrgyzstan.

Career
Yuldashev has had a flair for business since an early age and started his first company in 2003 when he was 18 years old. It was a retail and wholesale business in Kyrgyzstan. In 2006, Yuldashev moved to Dubai and found a wholesale company called Alifco LLC followed by entering the e-commerce industry in the region with brand name AWOK.com in 2013.

References

Further reading
Awok Launch in Middle East (Trade Arabia)

Living people
Kyrgyzstani businesspeople
People from Dubai
People from Osh
1985 births